Luca De Aliprandini (born 1 September 1990) is an Italian World Cup alpine ski racer and specializes in giant slalom. Born in Cles, Trentino, he competed for Italy at the 2014 Winter Olympics in alpine skiing, and again in 2018. At his second World Championships in 2021 at Cortina d'Ampezzo, Italy, De Aliprandini won the silver medal in the giant slalom. Ten months later, he gained his first World Cup podium, runner-up in giant slalom at Alta Badia.

He has been in a relationship with Swiss alpine ski racer Michelle Gisin since 2014.

World Cup results

Season standings

Top ten finishes
0 wins
1 podium – (1 GS)

World Championship results

Olympic results

References

External links

1990 births
Living people
Olympic alpine skiers of Italy
Alpine skiers at the 2014 Winter Olympics
Alpine skiers at the 2018 Winter Olympics
Alpine skiers at the 2022 Winter Olympics
Italian male alpine skiers
People from Cles
Alpine skiers of Fiamme Gialle
Sportspeople from Trentino
21st-century Italian people